Galápagos is an Ecuadorian radio show aired every Saturday at 2100 UTC on HCJB La Voz de los Andes (12000 kHz, 25m band).

Synopsis
Galápagos is a 15 minute long radio show which talks about the economic and ecological development of the archipelago. It also promotes tourism and local music. The programme is hosted by Edwin Chamorro.

External links
HCJB official web site

Talk radio programs
Ecuadorian radio programs
Radio programs about agriculture
Radio programs about economics
Galápagos Islands